Daniele Emanuello (July 23, 1963 – December 3, 2007) was the head of the Sicilian Mafia in port city of Gela, Sicily. Emanuello had been a fugitive since 1996, and was subsequently added in the List of most wanted fugitives in Italy. Emanuello was under suspicion and wanted on charges of committing of crimes, including mafia association, drug trafficking and murder.

Death and aftermath
On December 3, 2007, Daniele Emanuello was killed by the Italian police while attempting to flee, in Villarosa, near Enna.

Emanuello's family requested a cathedral funeral service, which was refused by Michele Pennisi, Bishop of Piazza Armerina, who was subsequently in receipt of death threats.

References

1964 births
2007 deaths
Gangsters from the Province of Caltanissetta
People from Gela
People shot dead by law enforcement officers in Italy
Sicilian mafiosi